Me & My Piano is the debut album from American pop singer Krystal Harris as Krystal.

The only single from the album was "Supergirl!" and was featured in the Disney teen film The Princess Diaries. Also a remixed version of "Love Is A Beautiful Thing" is featured on the Legally Blonde soundtrack. Me & My Piano's final peak on the Billboard Top 200 chart was #86.

Track listing
 "Supergirl!"
 "My Religion"
 "Angel On My Shoulder"
 "You're The Reason" (featuring AJ McLean)
 "Love Is A Beautiful Thing"
 "...Or Someone Else Will"
 "When You Hurt"
 "1/2 My Heart"
 "Goodbye"
 "Lead Me"
 "Let Me Be Your Friend"
 "Me & My Piano"

Singles
 "Supergirl!" (Summer 2001)

References

External links
 

2001 debut albums
Krystal Harris albums
Geffen Records albums
Contemporary R&B albums by American artists
Soul albums by American artists